A writ for the election of the 8th General Assembly of Nova Scotia was issued on October 21, 1799, returnable by December 23, 1799. The assembly convened on February 20, 1800, held six sessions, and was dissolved on May 28, 1806.

Sessions
Dates of specific sessions are under research.

Governor and Council
Governor-in-Chief of British North America: Sir Robert Milnes
Lieutenant Governor: Sir John Wentworth

Technically, Gov. Milnes was appointed not as governor general, but as Governor of the Canadas, New Brunswick, and Nova Scotia (four simultaneous appointments).  Since a governor only has power when actually in their jurisdiction, the three additional appointments were effectively meaningless, with Lt. Gov. Wentworth serving as acting governor.

The members of the Council are currently under research.

House of Assembly

Officers
Speaker of the House:
Richard John Uniacke of Queens County -resigned November 30, 1805.
William Cottnam Tonge of Newport Township -elected November 30, 1805.
Clerk of the House: James Boutineau Francklin
Sergeant at Arms: Adolphus Veith -appointed March 10, 1790

Division of seats
The customary assignment of seats was continued: 4 seats assigned to Halifax County, 2 seats to the other counties and to Halifax Township, and 1 seat to the other townships, for a total of 39 seats.

Members
Amherst Township
Thomas Lusby -died February 10, 1801.
Thomas Law Dickson -by-election, took seat February 26,1802.
Annapolis County
Thomas Millidge
James Moody
Annapolis Township
Phineas Lovett, Jr
Barrington Township
John Sargent -took seat March 22, 1800.
Cornwallis Township
Lemuel Morton
Cumberland County
Thomas Roach
George Oxley
Digby Township
Henry Rutherford
Falmouth Township
Jeremiah Northup
Granville Township
Edward Thorne
Halifax County
William Cottnam Tonge -declared not qualified February 28, 1800.  (was also elected to Newport Township)
Michael Wallace -by-election March 22, 1800, took seat March 26, 1800. Appointed to Council, April 23, 1803.
William Lyon -by-election, took seat June 1, 1803.
Edward Mortimer
James Fulton
Charles Morris (1759–1831)
Halifax Township
William Cochran
John George Pyke -declared invalid election March 14, 1800.
Andrew Belcher -by-election, April 9, 1800, took seat April 16, 1800.  Appointed to Council June 11, 1801.
John George Pyke -by-election, took seat February 25, 1802.
Hants County
John McMonagle
Shubael Dimock
Horton Township
Joseph Allison
Kings County
Jonathan Crane
William Allen Chipman
Liverpool Township
Joseph Barss
Londonderry Township
Samuel Chandler
Lunenburg County
Casper Wollenhaupt
Lewis Morris Wilkins
Lunenburg Township
John Bolman -took seat February 27, 1800.
Newport Township
William Cottnam Tonge
Onslow Township
Daniel McCurdy
Queens County
Richard John Uniacke -seat vacated November 30, 1805 go to England on personal business.
James Taylor -died January 15, 1801.
Snow Parker -by-election March 24, 1801, took seat June 22, 1801.
Shelburne County
George Gracie -took seat March 8, 1800, died November 25, 1805.
James Cox -took seat March 8, 1800, died in 1805
Jacob Van Buskirk -by-election, took seat November 30, 1805.
Shelburne Township
Colin Campbell -took seat March 22, 1800.
Sydney County
Joseph Marshall -took seat June 11, 1801.
William Campbell -took seat June 18, 1801, seat declared vacant January 17, 1806, "Atty. Gen'l. of Cape Breton Island and has not attended for two sessions."
Truro Township
Simon Bradstreet Robie
Windsor Township
George Henry Monk -took seat March 10, 1800.
Yarmouth Township
Nathan Utley -took seat March 21, 1800.  Died 1804, apparently did not attend 1802-1803.
Samuel Sheldon Poole -by-election, took seat June 28, 1804.

Note:  Unless otherwise noted, members were elected at the general election, and took their seats at the convening of the assembly.  By-elections are special elections held to fill specific vacancies.  When a member is noted as having taking their seat on a certain date, but a by-election isn't noted, the member was elected at the general election but arrived late.

References
 David Allison; "History of Nova Scotia", Bowen, Halifax, 1916. Vol. 2

08
1799 in Canada
1800 in Canada
1801 in Canada
1802 in Canada
1803 in Canada
1804 in Canada
1805 in Canada
1806 in Canada
1799 establishments in Nova Scotia
1806 disestablishments in Nova Scotia